Neela Parbat is a 1969 Pakistani Urdu film directed by Ahmad Bashir. The cast included Mohammad Ali, Husna, Sofia Bano, Komal, Zareen Panna and Agha Talish.

Cast
The cast of the film include:
 Husna
 Mohammad Ali
 Sofia Bano
 Komal
 Talish
 Kemal Irani
 Zareen Panna
 Azad
 Gotam
 Piyarang Qadir
 Fomi

Production

Background
It was Pakistan's one of the earliest experimental feature films. It had experimentation by the film director with the Freudian sensual themes which was very unusual for Pakistan at that time. So the film received a 'for adults only' rating. In this film, actress Komal had a really interesting foray into the parallel cinema. She portrayed the sensual play thing for actor Mohammad Ali.

Crew
The film was produced by Ahmed Bashir, directed by Ahmad Bashir/Hafeez Romani, and written by Mumtaz Mufti. The crew included:
 Cameramen: M. Hussain, Naseem Hassan, Nusrat Butt
 Other's assistant director: Arshad Mirza
 Background music: Saleem Iqbal
 Ass. Cameraman: Masood Butt

Soundtrack

Box office
The film was a flop with only 16 weeks at theaters.

References

External links
 

1969 films
Pakistani drama films
1960s Urdu-language films
Lollywood films
Urdu-language Pakistani films
Pakistani erotic films